Leonardo Salvador Sarao (April 13, 1921 – July 31, 2001) was the founder and owner of the Sarao Motors, a company known for designing, manufacturing and selling the jeepney, the most popular mode of transportation in the Philippines.  He is not the first person to alter the surplus jeeps left behind by the U.S. Army from World War II, but he saw them as a business opportunity for mass transportation. He redesigned the surplus jeeps to increase its functionality by extending the body to accommodate at least twice the number of passengers and by putting some railings at the back and top for extra passengers to cling to, and for cargoes.  He revolutionized a burgeoning industry and changed the life of generations of Filipinos.

Leonardo Sarao was awarded The Outstanding Filipino Award (TOFIL) in 1997 for Entrepreneurship.  He started Sarao Motors from a borrowed PHP700.  Though he only attained Grade 6 level of education because of poverty, he was able to make the company grow into a multimillion peso conglomerate.

References

20th-century Filipino businesspeople
1921 births
2001 deaths
People from Imus
People from Las Piñas
Businesspeople from Metro Manila
Filipino company founders